Luca Palazzo (born 21 February 1987) is an Italian footballer who plays as a midfielder for Italian Eccellenza club Pontedecimo.

Club career

Early career
Born in Seregno, the Province of Monza and Brianza (historically part of the Province of Milan), Palazzo joined Internazionale in 2004. At first he was the member of Berretti U18 reserve team (B team of U20 age group) but later promoted to Primavera U20 team. Palazzo played all 3 matches of the playoffs, losing to Empoli in the quarter-finals. Palazzo also capped for Inter first team in club friendlies. However, he only played 3 times in 2005–06 season for Primavera.

In January 2006 Palazzo was transferred to Serie D club Varese in temporary deal. In mid-2006, Palazzo was signed by Serie C1 club Pro Sesto in co-ownership deal for a peppercorn fee of €1,000. Born 1988 players Marco Dalla Costa, Daniele Federici, Nicola Redomi, Alessandro Brioschi, Alessio Colombo and Alessandro Mosca also joined the club as they were the surplus of Primavera.

Lega Pro
Palazzo made his professional debut with the tiny Lombardy club Pro Sesto. He made 23 starts (28 appearances) in 2006–07 Serie C1. In June 2007 Inter gave up the remain 50% registration rights for free. However, in the new season Palazzo only played 4 times.

In mid-2008 Palazzo was re-signed by Varese. However Palazzo only played 8 times for the group A champion of Lega Pro Seconda Divisione (ex- Serie C2). Palazzo made a single appearance in 2009–10 Lega Pro Prima Divisione. In January 2010 Palazzo was signed by Valenzana. Palazzo played 35 times for the Piedmont in  seasons in Lega Pro Seconda Divisione. He was offered a new contract on 21 July 2010. However his contract was not renewed at the start of 2011–12 season.

Amateur
Palazzo was released by the Valenza based club on 30 June 2011. He joined a Serie D club Aquanera Comollo Novi (Italian fifth division). The team was based in Novi Ligure (new Liguria), also from the same province where Valenza is located. However, in mid-season the club was expelled from the league due to irregularity in the registration documents submitted at the start of the league. In January 2012 Palazzo moved south, signing a deal with Eccellenza Liguria club Pontedecimo (Italian sixth division). The club was based in the quartiere of the same name, from Genoa, the capital of Liguria region.

International career
Palazzo capped for Italy youth teams after he joined Internazionale. He was the member of Italy national under-18 football team, the feeder team of U19. However his poor performance in the 2005–06 led to him being left out of the U19 squad.

After joined Pro Sesto, Palazzo was spotted by the "C" team of U20, the representative team of Serie C. He received a call-up to the second match of 2006–07 Mirop Cup against Slovenia (on bench, substitute record not available). He also received call-up from the same team for 2007 Lega Pro Quadrangular Tournament, against three other U21 representative teams of Serie C2. However, did not play. Palazzo received his last call-up against Belgium, which he was the starting midfielder.

Honours

Club
Varese
 Lega Pro Seconda Divisione: 2009

References

External links
 FIGC 
 Football.it Profile 

1987 births
Living people
People from Seregno
Italian footballers
Inter Milan players
S.S.D. Varese Calcio players
S.S.D. Pro Sesto players
Valenzana Mado players
Association football midfielders
Footballers from Lombardy
Sportspeople from the Province of Monza e Brianza